The 2014–15 Liga Națională season was the 65th season of the Liga Națională, the highest professional basketball league in Romania.

The first half of the season consisted of 13 teams and 156-game regular season games (24 games for each of the 13 teams) beginning on 1 October 2014 and ended on 28 March 2015, just before the play-offs.

Teams for 2014–15 season

Personnel and sponsorship

Regular season

Play-offs

Awards
Finals MVP
 Vladimir Tica – CSU Asesoft Ploiești

References

External links
Official site of the Romanian basketball federation
Halfcourt.info (Romanian and English)
Numaibaschet.ro (Romanian)
Baschetromania.ro (Romanian)

2016-17
Romanian
Lea